Gun n' Rose (released as Guns N' Roses in the Philippines) is a 1992 Hong Kong action film directed by Clarence Fok and starring Alan Tang, Andy Lau, Leon Lai and Simon Yam.

Plot
Alan Lung is the adopted son of Taiwanese triad leader Lung Yat-fu. Alan is highly favored by Lung, who appoints him as his successor over his two biological sons Simon and Bowie. One time when Lung was shot, Alan blames Bowie, who then becomes a police informant attempting to kill Alan. Alan survives so Lung tells his second son Simon to kill Bowie while Simon also hires an assassin, Leon, to kill Alan. Alan then escapes from Taiwan to Hong Kong where he meets triad leader Andy, his girlfriend Loletta and his sister Carrie. While hiding in Hong Kong with his crippled wife Monica, Alan is dragged back into the triad life by Andy’s incessant activities and the reappearance of Leon. Finally, Alan decides to go back to Taiwan and get even with Simon.

Cast
Alan Tang as Alan Lung
Andy Lau as Andy
Leon Lai as Leon
Simon Yam as Simon Lung
Bowie Lam as Bowie Lung
Monica Chan as Monica Shum
Carrie Ng as Carrie
Loletta Lee as Loletta
Michael Chan as Brother Chicken
John Ching as Bee
Joey Leung as Skinny
Tien Feng as Lung Yat-fu
Wong Kim-fung as Fung
Lau Shung-fung as Simon's gangster
Adam Chan as Simon's gangster
Hung Chi-sang as Simon's gangster
Kwan Yung as Alan's bodyguard
Leung Sam as Alan's gangster
Wong Kam-tong as Alan's gangster
Leung Kam-san as Heroin dealer
Wan Seung-lam as Heroin dealer's thug
Peter Ngor as Lecherous patient
Lam Sek as Bee's gangster
Lam Foo-wah as Bee's gangster
Hui Si-man as Monica's mom
Fan Chin-hung as Rival gang member

Release
Gun n' Rose was released in Hong Kong on 5 June 1992. In the Philippines, the film was released by Daifuku Films as Guns N' Roses in 1993.

Box office
The film grossed HK$14,944,759 at the Hong Kong box office during its theatrical run 5 June to 18 June 1992 in Hong Kong.

References

External links

Gun n' Rose at Hong Kong Cinemagic

Gun n' Rose film review at LoveHKFilm.com

1992 films
1990s crime action films
1990s Cantonese-language films
Films directed by Clarence Fok
Films set in Hong Kong
Films set in Taiwan
Films shot in Hong Kong
Gun fu films
Hong Kong crime action films
Triad films
1990s Hong Kong films